Henry Arthur Waterman (June 7, 1872 – October 25, 1955) was a Canadian politician. He represented the electoral district of Yarmouth in the Nova Scotia House of Assembly from 1938 to 1949. He was a member of the Nova Scotia Liberal Party.

Waterman was born in 1872 at Yarmouth, Nova Scotia. He was educated at the Massachusetts Institute of Technology, and was a mechanical engineer. He married Coral Davis in 1919, and retired to Yarmouth.

Waterman served as mayor of Yarmouth from 1928 to 1929. Waterman entered provincial politics in 1938, winning a byelection for the Yarmouth riding by acclamation. He was re-elected in the 1941 and 1945 elections. He did not reoffer in the 1949 election. Waterman died at Yarmouth on October 25, 1955.

References

1872 births
1955 deaths
Massachusetts Institute of Technology alumni
Mayors of places in Nova Scotia
Nova Scotia Liberal Party MLAs
People from Yarmouth, Nova Scotia